The Mystery Ship is a 1917 American adventure film serial directed by Harry Harvey and Henry MacRae. The film is considered to be lost.

Cast

Chapter titles
 The Crescent Scar
 The Grip of Hate
 Adrift
 The Secret of the Tomb
 The Fire God
 Treachery
 One Minute to Live
 Hidden Hands
 The Black Masks
 The Rescue
 The Line of Death
 The Rain of Fire
 The Underground House
 The Masked Riders
 The House of Trickery
 The Forced Marriage
 The Deadly Torpedo
 The Fight in Mid-Air

Reception
Like many American films of the time, The Mystery Ship was subject to cuts by city and state film censorship boards. For example, the Chicago Board of Censors required the cut of:
 Chapter 1: three gambling scenes
Chapter 2: the "slugging" (knocking unconscious) of a man and throwing him overboard
Chapter 5: the striking a man on the head with a stone, the mob inside a wall shooting a man, and a man falling after the shooting
Chapter 6: the abduction of a young woman in an automobile and the assault on the male driver
Chapter 8: the choking of a man on the ship deck by a gangster, two scenes of a man threatening a young woman with gun, a Chinese man threatening a woman with dagger, a Chinese man putting poison on food, two closeup shots of a young woman choking a Chinese woman after she regains consciousness, a distant choking scene, and the last scene in the reel showing a dagger descending towards a young woman
Chapter 9, Reel 1: three closeup shots of a Chinese man threatening a young woman with dagger, and a man prying a window open to enter a house
Chapter 9, Reel 2: a man drugging cotton and placing it in a telephone receiver, all scenes of man in a torture chair, five fight scenes, the placing of an unconscious young woman in an automobile, the threatening of a man with a fireplace poker, and the "slugging" of a man at a garden gate
Chapter 10: the last two torture scenes and the intertitle "You'll never leave us alive"
Chapter 13, Reel 1: the attack, gagging and binding of a young woman; the entire scene of men shooting at each other from behind barricades of rugs and curtains, including shots of falling men
Chapter 13, Reel 2: the intertitile "She go die now", the first scene of a Chinese man chaining a young women to a platform, all torture scenes where flames are shown except the one where the young woman is rescued, a gun shooting through an opening in wall, two shots of a Chinese man falling, a man aiming a gun at a prisoner, and the shooting from a trap door
Chapter 14, Reel 1: the chloroforming of a man by the Man of Mystery, and all but the first and last struggle scenes between a man and a young woman
Chapter 15, Reel 1: the "slugging" of an agent by a foreign spy
Chapter 15, Reel 2: the flash flogging scene, three scenes of a man being choked with a rope, all scenes of a man on a young woman's bed after he takes false whiskers off
Chapter 16, Reel 1: the scene of a young woman and a man in bed, the scene of Gaston pulling the man from the bed, the man covering his face with his hands, the young woman in bed covering her face with her hands, the young woman turning away from the man and burying her face in a pillow
Chapter 16, Reel 2: the binding of a young woman
Chapter 17: all but the last holdup scene, the two intertitles "You mean our wife" and "The one that gets the Queen of Hearts—gets the lady", three scenes of police officers being shot at, all shots of men playing cards whilst waiting for a young women to wake up until the time she awakens, three scenes of a gang shooting at police officers, two scenes of men shooting at each other in a cellar, three scenes of a gang shooting at the titular Mystery Ship
Chapter 18, Reel 2: the shooting from a door and the shooting inside a shed

See also
 List of film serials
 List of film serials by studio
 List of lost films

References

External links

1917 films
1917 lost films
1910s action adventure films
American action adventure films
American silent serial films
American black-and-white films
Films directed by Henry MacRae
Lost American films
Universal Pictures film serials
1910s American films
Silent adventure films